In Australian Aboriginal mythology (specifically: Kamilaroi), Birrangulu (‘face like an axe handle’, from birra ‘axe handle’ and ngulu ‘forehead’) or Birrahgnooloo is a goddess of fertility who would send floods if properly asked. She is said to have had a long thin face.

Birrangulu is one of two wives of Baiame, with whom she is the mother of Daramulum.

In the Guwamu language, Birrangula, is a name of the Creator.

References

Australian Aboriginal goddesses
Fertility goddesses